The Hezil Suyu ( Nahr al-Hayzal, or Hezil Çayı or the Nizil river, in Turkish language suyu means water of) is a river in south-eastern Turkey in the Eastern Anatolia Region which flows entirely in the Şırnak Province and is part of the natural border between Turkey and the Kurdistan region of Iraq. Just before it forms the border, it is dammed by the Silopi Dam. Just west of the city of Zakho in Iraq, it joins the Little Khabur river, which then forms the border.

The Hezil Suyu river is not to be mistaken with the Little Khabur river
which is tributary to the Tigris river
and flows east of Zakho city and goes through the Zakho city joining its tributary the Hezil Suyu west of Zakho city.

References

Border rivers
Iraq–Turkey border
Rivers of Turkey
Landforms of Şırnak Province